The Layos Sarcophagus is a paleochristian sarcophagus found in Layos, Toledo in 1627 and now in Barcelona.

The iconography is focused on the dogma of the Incarnation, and it is opposed to docetism and monophysitism.

Access
The original is kept at the Museu Frederic Marès in Barcelona.
In October 2007 two replicas arrived in Castilla La Mancha. One was put on show at the Visigothic Museum (Museo de los Concilios y de la Cultura Visigoda).

See also
There is another sarcophagus from Layos in the Real Academia de la Historia.

References

Bibliography
 
 

Sarcophagi
Early Christian inscriptions
Early Christian art